Tadlac Lake, also colloquially known as Alligator Lake, is a freshwater volcanic crater lake located in Barangay Tadlac, in the municipality of Los Baños of Laguna province in the Philippines. The lake-filled maar is located along the southern shore of Laguna de Bay, the largest lake in the country, with Alligator Lake protruding out of the shore of the larger lake. If not for its slightly-elevated crater rim, Alligator Lake would be wholly engulfed by Laguna de Bay.

The crater lake is one of the maars of the Laguna Volcanic Field. It is listed as one of the inactive volcanos in the Philippines by the Philippine Institute of Volcanology and Seismology (PHIVOLCS).

Tadlac lake is also notable for its history of annual Lake overturns, locally called langal.  This phenomenon, rare elsewhere but usually occurring in Tadlac lake during the cold months of December to February, is the result of trapped carbon dioxide (CO2) erupting from the deep layers of the lake towards the surface, leading to fish kills due to low levels of dissolved oxygen. This phenomenon was greatly heightened by the introduction of aquaculture to the lake in the mid-1980s, eventually leading to a massive and costly fishkill in 1999, which in turn led to the cessation of aquaculture activities on the lake.

Prior to the introduction of aquaculture, Alligator Lake was considered as an oligotrophic lake, having low nutrient content and low algal production, resulting in very clear water with high drinking-water quality.

Geography and geology
Alligator Lake is located in Barangay Tadlac, in the hot springs resort town of Los Baños ('The Baths' in English) near the border with Calamba in the province of Laguna. The lake is contained in a piece of land jutting out to Laguna de Bay that was known as Malilimbas Point, and is directly situated below the northeastern slope of Mount Makiling, the highest mountain in the Laguna Volcanic Field. Because of its origin, the lake has no outlet and is replenished only by rainfall.

It has an average depth of  so swimming is not recommended because of its depth and the sudden drop along its shoreline.

The Tadlac Barangay Road runs east of the lake but does not circle the lake. Another road runs west of Alligator lake. The lands around the lake are privately owned, and some owners have established resorts around the lake. The Laguna Lake Development Authority (LLDA), as mandated by the government, manages Laguna de Bay and its surrounding areas including Alligator Lake.

Lake overturns 
Lake overturns or carbon dioxide (CO2) eruption from deep within, locally called as langal, normally occurs during the months of December to February. During this period some indigenous fishes of the lake are often observed gasping for air near the lake surface.

This phenomenon was greatly heightened by the introduction of aquaculture to the lake in the mid-1980s, eventually leading to a massive and costly fishkill in 1999, which in turn led to the cessation of aquaculture activities on the lake.

Etymology
During the Spanish colonial period, the lake was known as Laguna de los Caimanes (Lake of Alligators or Alligator Lake). The great number of crocodilians that used to live in its waters gave the lake its name. Today, alligators or crocodiles have been extirpated in and around Alligator Lake and Laguna de Bay.

Suggested etymologies for the name tadlac include a kind of "wild ginger" and a grass closely related to sugarcane.

Documenting field expeditions he conducted during his time with the International Rice Research Institute, agricultural scientist and journalist Thomas Hargrove noted that Tadlak was the Tagalog term for a kind of wild ginger which he described as "pulpy with a red bulb."

Alternatively, historian Zeus A. Salazar has suggested that the name tadlac may refer to a local variety of sugarcane which he theorized to be common in Laguna and Batangas before the propagation of modern sugarcane, based on linguistic similarities with the local name of Themeda arundinacea in Central Luzon.

Economic History

Quarrying

Starting around the same time, the hill on the northern edge of the lake was quarried by its private owner and sold as building materials for home construction. The destruction continued unopposed by the lax management of LLDA, and the local government of Los Baños recognized the activity as the right of the land owner to develop his property. This was back when the Philippine Environmental Impact Assessment System was not yet fully established.

Aquaculture
From 1986 until the late 1990s, the lake was heavily used for aquaculture until a massive fishkill occurred in 1999. Through the collaborative efforts of the local leaders and the Laguna Lake Development Authority (LLDA), aquaculture was stopped saving the lake from further deterioration.

Accessing the lake
A park is located on the east side of the lake along Tadlac Barangay Road.

The lake can also be accessed through the road west of the lake and through the "cut" north of the lake.

References

External links
 
 Geographic data related to Alligator Lake (Philippines) at OpenStreetMap
 Laguna Lake Development Authority Official Website

Landforms of Laguna (province)
Volcanic crater lakes
Volcanic lakes of the Philippines
Inactive volcanoes of the Philippines
Los Baños, Laguna